The earth pyramids in South Tyrol are a special natural phenomenon that comes about in particular terrain, usually after a landslide or an unhinging of the earth.

The main cause of the formation of earth pyramids is the continuous alternation of periods of torrential rain and drought. These phenomena, in particularly friable terrain, over the years, increasingly erode the ground and form such earth pyramids. Usually the pyramids are formed in terrain very well sheltered from wind so that they cannot be damaged by it.

Moreover, the life of the earth pyramids is strongly dependent on the climate which reigns during the time in which it is shaped by the rock that covers it.

There are several earth pyramids that can be safely visited. Among the most famous and admired the following are the most outstanding:
 the earth pyramids of Ritten, a plateau above Bolzano, which are divided into three distinct groups near the villages Klobenstein, Oberbozen, and Unterinn
 the earth pyramids of Platten near Percha in the Puster Valley

Other, less famous, earth pyramids are:
 in Terenten, Puster Valley
 in Mölten
 in Jenesien near Bolzano
 in the hinterland of Merano, in Tirol, Kuens, and Riffian
 in Karneid and Steinegg, one of its hamlets
 in Neustift in the Rigger valley
 in Segonzano in the Cembra valley in the adjoining province Trentino (not South Tyrol any more)

Further reading
 Gerhard Benl, Über Südtiroler Erdpyramiden und ihre Entstehung (About the earth pyramides in South Tyrol and their formation), in «Jahrbuch des Vereins zum Schutz der Alpenpflanzen und -tiere» (Yearbook of the Club for the protection of alpine plants and animals), Verein zum Schutz der Bergwelt (Club for the protection of the mountains), 31, Munich, 1966.

References

External links 

Geography of South Tyrol
Erosion landforms